Zirkuh is a village in Kohgiluyeh and Boyer-Ahmad Province, Iran.

Zirkuh or Zir Kuh or Zir Kooh may also refer to various places in Iran:
 Zir Kuh, Tabas, South Khorasan Province
 Zirkuh County, in South Khorasan Province
 Zirkuh Rural District (disambiguation)